Marini's on 57 is the highest rooftop bar, restaurant and lounge in Malaysia. Located on the 57th floor of Menara 3 Petronas in Kuala Lumpur, it started operations in June 2012. A multi-award-winning establishment, it is owned and operated by chef restaurateur Modesto Marini.

Description
Marini's on 57 is situated on the roof top of Menara 3 Petronas, next to the Petronas Twin Towers in the heart of Kuala Lumpur City Centre, and provides a 360° view of the city. The establishment has a dedicated private lift that takes visitors directly to the 57th floor. The property itself is divided into three sections: a bar, a restaurant, and a lounge, all with floor-to-ceiling glass windows. It operates a dress code policy.

Celebrities
Marini's on 57 has hosted a number of celebrities including Tiger Woods, Formula One drivers Lewis Hamilton and Nico Rosberg, former English footballer and manager Glenn Hoddle, LPGA stars Paula Creamer and Michelle Wie, Danish tennis player Caroline Wozniacki, Award Winning singer Ed Sheeran American PGA Professional Chris Stroud, season one winner of Masterchef Whitney Miller, designer Jimmy Choo, singer Nicole Scherzinger, and Rick Harrison and Corey Harrison of Pawn Stars.

Notable events
Marini's on 57 was the venue of the after-party of the 2014 Laureus World Sports Awards. In 2014, its Formula 1 party featured British House Music DJ Danny Rampling, who is widely credited as one of the original founders of the UK's rave/club scene, and his wife, Ilona Rampling.

Album
In 2014, the father of Balearic Chill Out Music, DJ José Padilla, created an album to commemorate the second anniversary of Marini's on 57 called Sunset Hours Volume One. The album will be launched in Ibiza, Spain, on 20 June 2014.

Media references
Marini's on 57 has been featured in a number of television shows and programmes including the Travel Channel International's "Asian Times", Germany's most popular reality show, Die Geissen, MasterChef Indonesia Season 3, The Apartment Style Edition Season 2, The Apprentice Asia and also on the Asian Food Channel.

Awards
 Signum Virtutis (Seal of Excellence), Seven Stars Luxury Hospitality and Lifestyle Awards, presented by Prince della Torre e Tasso
 Hospitality Asia Platinum Awards 2014 – multiple awards including "Icon of the Year" for Modesto Marini, Restaurant of the Year Dining Experience and Nightspot of the Year Outstanding Concept
 Malaysia International Gourmet Festival 2013 – multiple awards
  Expatriate Lifestyle's Best of Malaysia Travel Awards 2013
 Malaysian Tatler – Malaysia's Best Restaurants
  Top 10 in ‘My Favourite Interior Design – Restaurant Edition Award

References

External links
 
 The Marini's Group website

2012 establishments in Malaysia
Restaurants in Malaysia
Malaysian cuisine
Restaurants established in 2012